The Great Lakes–St. Lawrence River Basin Water Resources Compact is a legally binding interstate compact among the U.S. states of Illinois, Indiana, Michigan, Minnesota, New York, Ohio, Pennsylvania and Wisconsin.  The compact details how the states manage the use of the Great Lakes Basin's water supply and builds on the 1985 Great Lakes Charter and its 2001 Annex.  The compact is the means by which the states implement the governors' commitments under the Great Lakes–St. Lawrence River Basin Sustainable Water Resources Agreement that also includes the Premiers of Ontario and Quebec.

The Council of Great Lakes Governors, which guided the negotiations that resulted in the Compact, now serves as secretariat to the Governors' Compact Council created by the Compact, and now operates as the Conference of Great Lakes and St. Lawrence Governors and Premiers.

Ratification
Following approval by each of the eight member state legislatures, the compact was signed by Minnesota Gov. Tim Pawlenty on February 20, 2007; Illinois Gov. Rod Blagojevich on August 17, 2007; Indiana Gov. Mitch Daniels on February 20, 2008; New York Gov. Eliot Spitzer on March 4, 2008; Wisconsin Gov. Jim Doyle on May 27, 2008; Ohio Gov. Ted Strickland on June 27, 2008; Pennsylvania Gov. Ed Rendell on July 4, 2008; and Michigan Gov. Jennifer Granholm on July 9, 2008.  The U.S. Senate passed the compact on August 1, 2008, and the U.S. House of Representatives followed on September 23, 2008. President George W. Bush signed it on October 3, 2008.  The compact became state and federal law on December 8, 2008.

Wisconsin v. Illinois United States Supreme Court case
Due to the United States Supreme Court ruling in Wisconsin v. Illinois, the State of Illinois is not subject to certain provisions of the compact pertaining to new or increased withdrawals or diversions from the Great Lakes.

Waukesha Proposal
In 2013, the city of Waukesha, Wisconsin applied for permission from the State of Wisconsin to withdraw water from Lake Michigan. City water historically drawn from an aquifer reached radium levels exceeding federal standards. After protest and later negotiation with state officials, Waukesha became obligated to find a new source of water by 2018. The city's limits lay 1.5 miles outside of the Lake Michigan drainage boundary; however the county in which it resides straddles both the Mississippi (via the Fox River, which runs through Waukesha) and Great Lakes watersheds.

In 2015, the Wisconsin Department of Natural Resources (DNR) preliminarily determined that the proposal was approvable in its Draft Technical Review and also released a Draft Environmental Impact Statement. The public comment period on the Draft Technical Review and Draft Environmental Impact Statement ended on August 28, 2015.

On January 7, 2016, the DNR forwarded the submission to the Great Lakes–St. Lawrence Water Resources Regional Body for review and the Great Lakes–St. Lawrence Water Resources Council for review and decision. Several environmental groups argued the proposal did not comply with Compact requirements and demanded a thorough review. The application was approved with conditions by the Compact Council on June 21, 2016.

See also
Canada–United States border
Canada–United States relations

References

External links
Great Lakes–St. Lawrence River Basin Water Resources Council
Great Lakes–St. Lawrence River Water Resources Regional Body
Navigating Wisconsin's Obligations Under the Public Trust Doctrine 

Great Lakes
United States interstate compacts
Acts of the 110th United States Congress
Water law in the United States